Li Denghui may refer to:

 Lee Teng-hui (1923–2020), fourth president of the Republic of China (Taiwan)
 Li Denghui (educator) (1873–1947), president of Fudan University, Shanghai